The Q1, Q36, and Q43 bus routes constitute a public transit line in Queens, New York City. The routes run primarily along Hillside Avenue from the Jamaica, Queens commercial and transportation hub towards several eastern Queens neighborhoods on the city border with Nassau County. Originally operated by the North Shore Bus Company until 1947, all three routes are now operated by MTA Regional Bus Operations under the New York City Transit brand.

Route description and service

The Q1, Q36, and Q43 are the primary bus services along Hillside Avenue, sharing the corridor between Merrick Boulevard (near the 165th Street Bus Terminal) and 212th Street. Several other routes provide service along the corridor east of the bus terminal before diverging north or south to other streets. During rush hours, the Q36 and Q43 provide limited-stop service in the peak direction (towards Jamaica mornings; towards eastern Queens afternoons). At these times, there is no Q36 or Q43 local service; local service is provided by the Q1 and other routes.

Q1
The Q1 begins at Bays 1 and 2 of the 165th Street Bus Terminal. It runs north along Merrick Boulevard to Hillside Avenue, then proceeds east along Hillside Avenue. At adjacent intersections with Springfield Boulevard and Braddock Avenue, the Q1 splits into two branches. One runs south along Springfield to Jamaica Avenue at the Queens Village Long Island Rail Road station. The second branch runs south along Braddock Avenue, terminating at 243rd Street and the Cross Island Parkway in Bellerose. Immediately south and east, Braddock Avenue merges into Jamaica Avenue/Jericho Turnpike along the border with the Nassau County village of Bellerose. During late night hours, the Q1 serves both Springfield Boulevard and Braddock Avenue as a single clockwise loop, running south along Braddock, west along Jamaica Avenue, then north along Springfield back towards Jamaica.

Q36

The Q36 begins at Bay 6 of the 165th Street Bus Terminal. It runs east along Hillside Avenue to 212th Street/212th Place, turns south, then follows Jamaica Avenue (later continuous with Jericho Turnpike) east along the Queens-Nassau county border. Most Q36 buses terminate at 257th Street in Floral Park just past Little Neck Parkway, the southeastern corner of Queens. On weekdays, some Q36 buses turn north onto Little Neck Parkway and run nearly the entire length of the street, terminating at the LIRR's Little Neck station at the northern end of Queens. Prior to June 2010, this was the separate  route, which shared its southern terminus with the Q36's eastern terminus.

Q36 Limited buses make all stops east of 212th Place, and run local along the entire Little Neck Parkway corridor. On weekdays, Little Neck service begins during the AM rush period, with every fourth or fifth limited bus running to or from Little Neck in the peak direction during rush hours. Off-peak weekday service, including all midday service, alternates between Floral Park and Little Neck. Early morning, late night, and weekend service operates only to Floral Park.

Q43

The Q43 runs along nearly the entire length of Hillside Avenue. It begins at Archer Avenue and Sutphin Boulevard, at the Sutphin Boulevard–Archer Avenue–JFK Airport subway station and the Jamaica terminal for the Long Island Rail Road and AirTrain JFK. The bus route travels north along Sutphin Boulevard, then east along Hillside Avenue to 268th Street in Floral Park, Queens, at the border with North New Hyde Park in Nassau County. Q43 Limited buses make all stops between Springfield Boulevard and 268th Street.

Other local bus service
Between Merrick Boulevard and Francis Lewis Boulevard, five additional Queens bus routes provide service along Hillside Avenue. All these routes begin at the 165th Street Bus Terminal, except the Q17 which terminates two blocks south at Archer Avenue. At 188th Street, the Q17 turns north towards Fresh Meadows and Flushing. The Q2 and Q3 meanwhile turn south, running towards Belmont Park and John F. Kennedy International Airport respectively. At Francis Lewis Boulevard, the Q76 turns north along Francis Lewis towards Bayside, Whitestone, and College Point. The Q77 turns south along Francis Lewis towards Springfield Gardens. The Q17 also provides limited-stop service along its short segment of the corridor.

Express bus service
The X68 runs to and from Midtown Manhattan.

Nassau Inter-County Express service

There are several bus routes operated by Nassau Inter-County Express that also run along the Hillside Avenue corridor. Within New York City limits, NICE bus routes only drop off passengers in the westbound direction (toward Jamaica) and pick up passengers in the eastbound direction (toward Nassau County). East of city limits, the n22 continues east to Mineola, Roosevelt Field, and Hicksville, while the n26 travels north to Great Neck. All three routes turn south at Francis Lewis Boulevard, then east on Jamaica Avenue. The n1 travels south to Hewlett; the n6 travels east to Hempstead Transit Center in Hempstead, New York, via Hempstead Turnpike; and the n24 travels east to Roosevelt Field via Jericho Turnpike.

History

Early history
Service on the Q1, which was originally operated by Hillside Transportation Company, first operated in 1914. Service on this route began between Guilford Street station and Hollis via Hillside Avenue. The Q1 was later operated by Nevin-Queens Bus Corporation until February 17, 1935, when its operations were transferred to the North Shore Bus Company. North Shore operated the Q1 until November 1936. Z&M Coach Company then operated the route until June 30, 1939, upon which the North Shore Bus Company operated the Q1 again.

Service on the Q36 bus began in April 1926, being operated by Schenck Transportation. The Q36 was also operated by North Shore Bus Company at some point in the 1930s, though it is unclear if Z&M Coach also operated the route. Service on the Q43 began on May 24, 1935; it was also operated by Schenck Transportation.

World War II 
On May 12, 1941, the North Shore Bus Company modified several of its bus routes in Downtown Jamaica at the request of the New York City Police Department to reduce traffic congestion between 166th Street and 170th Street, and at the 169th Street subway station. As part of the changes, the Q43 began running overnight, and the western terminals of the Q1 and Q43 were swapped. The Q1 was truncated from the Long Island Rail Road's Jamaica station to the 165th Street Bus Terminal, while the Q43 was extended from the bus terminal to Jamaica station. This change was strongly opposed by Q43 riders as buses that left the Jamaica LIRR station at Archer Avenue and Parsons Boulevard were regularly filled to capacity by the time they arrived at the 169th Street station on Hillside Avenue several blocks north. Before the change, the buses had been nearly empty before reaching the station. In the following days, service was gradually increased by 25%, from 62 to 77 buses, but this was insufficient to accommodate all of the ridership.

As a result of wartime shortage during World War II, North Shore was directed to reduce its rush-hour milage by 20%. On May 29, 1943, the company cut 67 rush hour trips on its Jamaica routes, reduced frequencies during other times, and entirely discontinued some routes. As part of the changes, the Queens Village branch of the Q1 was made to operate during rush hours only. Service on the Bellerose branch was decreased from 24 to 20 trips during morning rush hours, from 24 to 17 during evening rush hours, and from 6 to 3 during other times. On the Q43, morning rush hour service was cut from 16 to 11 buses, and evening rush hour service was cut from 12 to 10 buses. Q36 service was largely unchanged during middays, reduced by four buses in the morning, and reduced by one bus in the evening.

The decline in North Shore's service prompted an investigation by the Long Island Star-Journal, a local publication. In 1946, following the end of the war, North Shore ordered 50 additional buses for all of its routes, though only ten had been delivered by February 1947.

City operation 
On March 30, 1947, North Shore Bus was taken over by the Board of Transportation (later the New York City Transit Authority), making the bus routes city operated. The city immediately added 120 new vehicles to ten bus routes, including the Hillside bus routes. Under municipal operations, service on the Q43 was increased on April 3 of that year.

On June 28, 1954, express service on the Q43 began, with expresses leaving the City Line between 7 a.m. and 8:12 a.m. and leaving from the 179th Street subway station between 5:30 p.m. and 6:28 p.m. at 8-minute intervals. These buses ran in the peak direction and were expected to save 2 to 3 minutes.

Express bus service began along the corridor on August 2, 1971, as the Q18X, as the first New York City Transit express service between Queens and Manhattan. The route was renumbered the X18 in 1976, before being renumbered to its current designation, the X68, on April 15, 1990.

In January 1993, peak-direction limited-stop service replaced peak-direction local service on the Q43. These buses began to make limited stops between 179th Street and Springfield Boulevard. The suggestion for this service originated from the Bellerose Commonwealth Civic Association in 1991. On April 7, 2008, limited-stop service on the Q36 was introduced, saving up to 5 minutes per trip. Q36 buses began to make limited stops between the 179th Street subway station and 212th Street, where that bus diverges from Hillside Avenue.

On January 7, 2013, alternate weekday Q36 buses started running along Little Neck Parkway, instead of running to the route's normal terminal at 257th Street and Jamaica Avenue, using the alignment of the former Q79 route that had been eliminated on June 27, 2010. This change was made as part of the MTA's Service Enhancement Plan, which was released in July 2012, and was intended to restore network coverage. The extension also gave the Little Neck Parkway corridor a one-seat ride to the subway at the Jamaica–179th Street station on Hillside Avenue. Q36 buses to the LIRR station in Little Neck were scheduled every 30 minutes, as opposed to connecting with every LIRR train due to the LIRR's erratic schedule, as well as to ensure reliability along the bus route.

Bus redesign
In December 2019, the MTA released a draft redesign of the Queens bus network. As part of the redesign, the Hillside Avenue buses would have contained one high-density "intra-borough" route, the QT18. There would have been several "subway connector" routes with nonstop sections on Hillside Avenue. These included the QT34 to Manhasset; the QT36 to Lake Success; the QT38 to Queens Village; and the QT39 to Cambria Heights. The redesign was delayed due to the COVID-19 pandemic in New York City in 2020, and the original draft plan was dropped due to negative feedback.

A revised plan was released in March 2022. As part of the new plan, the Q1 would become a "limited-stop" route and extended west and south to Sutphin Boulevard, replacing the Q6 to John F. Kennedy International Airport. The Q43 would become a "zone" route with nonstop sections on Hillside Avenue. The Q36 would be eliminated and replaced with a "zone" route, the Q45, which would run on Hillside Avenue and Little Neck Parkway. In addition, a new Q82 route from 165th Street to UBS Arena would replace the Q36 along 211th Street and Hollis Court Boulevard, and a new Q57 route from the Rockaway Boulevard station to Little Neck Parkway would replace the Q36 along Jamaica Avenue.

Notes

References

External links

 
 
 

Q001
001